Arse or ARSE may refer to:
 A Commonwealth English slang term for the buttocks
 Arse, the name for the Iberian settlement of modern-day Sagunto
 Arse, Indonesia, a district in the South Tapanuli Regency, North Sumatra province, Sumatra, Indonesia
 River Arse, a river in the Ariège department of southern France
 Arylsulfatase E, an arylsulfatase gene
 Animal Research – Scientific and Experimental (ARSE), a fictional animal research centre in the book The Plague Dogs

See also
 Autonomous Rotorcraft Sniper System (ARSS), the U.S. army's experimental robotic weapons system
 Arses of Persia, king of Persia between 338 BC and 336 BC
 Arses (genus), a genus of monarch flycatcher birds on the island of New Guinea
 Arce (disambiguation)
 Ars (disambiguation)
 Ass (disambiguation)